The Municipal Stadium in Brezno, Slovakia, is the football (soccer) stadium. It is the temporary home stadium of the FO ŽP Šport Podbrezová football team playing in the Slovak Fortuna Liga. The stadium has a capacity of 3,000.

See also
List of football stadiums in Slovakia

References

External links 
Brezno virtualne website (Slovak)

Football venues in Slovakia